John Patrick "Jack, Doctor" Brannen (September 13, 1874 – October 25, 1964) was a Canadian amateur ice hockey player who was active in the late 1890s and early 1900s. Brannen played as a rover, a position between defense and attack, for the Montreal Shamrocks in the AHAC and CAHL between 1896 and 1901. He won two Stanley Cups with the Shamrocks, in 1899 and 1900. Brannen also played with the Shamrocks in a Stanley Cup challenge series in 1901, but the team lost to the Winnipeg Victorias.

Brannen was born in Kenmore, Ontario in 1874. After his career in ice hockey he moved to northern New York where he worked as a medical doctor, though he occasionally acted as an umpire at hockey games in Montreal. He died in 1964, 90 years old.

Playing style
Jack Brannen was noted for his speed, which made him suitable for the free roaming rover position, and occasionally competed in speed skating events. In 1900 he won a 220-yard race in Montreal against some of the best speed skaters in the world, among them Norwegian Peter Sinnerud and American world titleholder Morris Wood. On the Montreal Shamrocks team Brannen played on a forward line with Harry Trihey, Arthur Farrell and Fred Scanlan, all three of whom later on were inducted into the Hockey Hall of Fame.

Statistics

Statistics per SIHR at sihrhockey.org

References

Notes

1874 births
1964 deaths
Canadian ice hockey players
Ice hockey people from Ontario
Montreal Shamrocks players
Stanley Cup champions
Canadian male speed skaters